Mastacembelus moorii is a species of fish in the family Mastacembelidae. It is endemic to Lake Tanganyika where it is a secretive species hiding among rocks or in the sediment in the littoral zone. The specific name honours the leader of an expedition to Lake Tanganyika, the biologist John Edmund Sharrock Moore (1870-1947).

References

moorii
Fish of Lake Tanganyika
Taxonomy articles created by Polbot
Fish described in 1898